The Tasmanian scrubwren or brown scrubwren (Sericornis humilis) is a bird species endemic to the temperate forests of Tasmania and nearby King Island.  It lives in the understory of rainforest, woodland, dry forest, swamps and coastal scrublands.

Placed in the family Pardalotidae in the Sibley-Ahlquist taxonomy, this has met with opposition and indeed is now no longer accepted; they instead are currently placed in the independent family Acanthizidae.  It is alternately considered a subspecies of the smaller white-browed scrubwren, and further research is needed to understand the relationships between the two species.

References 

Sericornis
Endemic birds of Tasmania
Birds described in 1838
Taxonomy articles created by Polbot